Örkelljunga Municipality (Örkelljunga kommun) is a municipality in Skåne County in southern Sweden. Its seat is located in the town Örkelljunga.

The present municipality was formed in 1971 through the amalgamation of "old" Örkelljunga with Skånes-Fagerhult

In sports, there is one team of national recognition and the pride of the town: Örkelljunga Volleybollklubb. Usually both the male and female teams are top contestant in the highest national league; having won it on several occasions. Within the municipal borders is also a renowned golf course.

Geography
Geographically, Örkelljunga Municipality is situated in north-western Scania on the border to the provinces Halland and Småland. These parts of Scania are notable for a varied terrain of leaf woods, farming areas and small lakes.

The closest large city is Helsingborg on the west coast, less than half an hour car drive away.

Localities
There are 4 urban areas (also called a Tätort or locality) in Örkelljunga Municipality.

In the table they are listed according to the size of the population as of December 31, 2005. The municipal seat is in bold characters.

References
Statistics Sweden

External links

Örkelljunga - Official site

Municipalities of Skåne County